Progress M-19 was a Russian unmanned Progress cargo spacecraft, which was launched in 1993 to resupply the Mir space station.

Launch
Progress M-19 launched on 10 August 1993 from the Baikonur Cosmodrome in Kazakhstan. It used a Soyuz-U rocket.

Docking
Progress M-19 docked with the aft port of the Kvant-1 module of Mir on 13 August 1993 at 00:00:06 UTC, and was undocked on 12 October 1993 at 17:59:06.

Decay
It remained in orbit until 18 October 1993, when it was deorbited. The mission ending occurred at 00:22:14 UTC on 19 October 1993, when the VBK-Raduga 8 capsule landed.

See also

 1993 in spaceflight
 List of Progress missions
 List of uncrewed spaceflights to Mir

References

Progress (spacecraft) missions
1993 in Kazakhstan
Spacecraft launched in 1993
Spacecraft which reentered in 1993
Spacecraft launched by Soyuz-U rockets